Alan Vaughan Lowe KC (born 1952) is a barrister and academic specialising in the field of international law. Chichele Professor of Public International Law in the University of Oxford, and a Fellow of All Souls College, Oxford,  1999–2012; Emeritus Professor of International Law and Emeritus Fellow of All Souls College, University of Oxford, since 2012. He was called to the Bar of England and Wales at Gray's Inn, of which he is a Bencher, in 1993 and appointed Queen's Counsel on 28 March 2008. He practices from Essex Court Chambers, London. He is a member of l'Institut de droit international.

Cases 

Judicial and Arbitral appointments include:-

 Ad hoc Judge, Kononov v. Latvia, European Court of Human Rights, 2009 – (nominated by Latvia)
 Arbitrator, Chevron v. Republic of Ecuador, 2009 - (arbitrator, appointed by Ecuador)
 Arbitrator, EVN v. Republic of Macedonia, 2009 - arbitrator, appointed by Macedonia)
 Arbitrator, Mercuria Energy Group Ltd v. The Republic of Poland, 2009- (appointed by Respondent)
 President, Hochtief v. Argentina, ICSID tribunal, 2009 - (appointed by agreement between the Parties))
 President, Investment arbitration against a European State (UNCITRAL / PCA), 2008 - (appointed by agreement between the Parties)
 President, Foresti & others v. Republic of South Africa, ICSID tribunal, 2007- (ICSID appointment)
 President, Barmek v. Azerbaijan, ICSID tribunal, 2007- 2009 (ICSID appointment)
 Arbitrator, Kardassopoulos v. Georgia, Fuchs v. Georgia, ICSID tribunal, 2007- 2010 (appointed by Respondent)
 Arbitrator, Sancheti v, UK, 2007 (appointed by the UK)
 President, Sistem v. Kyrgyz Republic, ICSID tribunal, 2006- 2009 (ICSID appointment)
 President, Bayview v. Mexico, ICSID tribunal, 2006-2007 (ICSID appointment)
 Arbitrator, Barbados v. Trinidad & Tobago maritime delimitation arbitral tribunal 2004-2006 (nominated by Barbados)
 Judge, European Nuclear Energy Tribunal 2006- (nominated by UK)

Reported cases as counsel include:-

 Apostolides v Orams & Ors [2010] EWCA Civ 9 (for Mr Apostolides)
 Demopoulos v. Turkey and 7 other cases, Grand Chamber ECHR, 2009 (for the Government of the Republic of Cyprus)
 Advisory Opinion on the Unilateral Declaration of Independence by the Provisional Institutions of Self-Government of Kosovo, International Court of Justice, 2009 (for Cyprus)
 R (Kibris Türk Hava Yollari Cta Holidays) v Secretary Of State For Transport [2009] EWHC 1918 (Admin) (for the Government of the Republic of Cyprus)
 Maritime Delimitation in the Black Sea, (Romania v. Ukraine), ICJ 2009 (for Romania)
 Request for Interpretation of the Judgment of 31 March 2004 in the Case concerning Avena and Other Mexican Nationals (Mexico v. United States of America), ICJ 2008 (for the USA)
 R (Corner House Research) v. Director of the Serious Fraud Office, [2008] UKHL 60 (for the Director, SFO)
 Varnava and Others v. Turkey, Grand Chamber ECHR, 2008 (for the Government of the Republic of Cyprus)
 R (Al Jedda) v. Secretary of State for Defence [2007] UKHL 58 (for appellant Mr Al Jedda)
 Republic of Ecuador v. Occidental Exploration & Production Co (No 2) [2007] EWCA Civ 656 (for Ecuador)
 The Tomimaru (Japan v. Russia) ITLOS, 2007 (for Japan)
 The Hoshinmaru (Japan v. Russia) ITLOS, 2007 (for Japan)
 R v. Jones [2006] UKHL 16 (for appellants Mr Pritchard and Mr Olditch)
 R v. Jones [2004] EWCA Crim 1981 (for appellants Mr Pritchard and Mr Olditch)
 Legal Consequences of the Construction of a Wall in the Occupied Palestinian Territory, ICJ, 2004 (for Palestine)
 Land Reclamation by Singapore (Malaysia v. Singapore), ITLOS, 2003, (for Singapore)
 Case concerning the MOX plant (Ireland v. UK), UNCLOS arbitration, 2003 (for Ireland)
 Azinas v. Cyprus, Grand Chamber ECHR, 2003 (for the Government of the Republic of Cyprus)
  Lauder v. Czech Republic, CME v. Czech Republic, ad hoc arbitral tribunals, 2001, (for Czech Republic)
 Case concerning the MOX plant (Ireland v. UK), ITLOS, 2001 (for Ireland)
 Southern Bluefin Tuna case, ad hoc arbitral tribunal, 2000 (for Japan)
  Case concerning Passage Through the Great Belt, ICJ, 1991 92 (for Finland)

Publications

References 

Fellows of All Souls College, Oxford
English legal professionals
Living people
International law scholars
Members of the Institut de Droit International
Members of the Permanent Court of Arbitration
1952 births
Chichele Professors of Public International Law
British judges of international courts and tribunals